Lionel Ryan (13 May 1935 – 6 September 2022) was an Australian rules footballer who played with Footscray in the Victorian Football League (VFL).

The plucky redhead missed out on the 1954 VFL Grand Final, being dropped for coach, Charlie Sutton but was named as an emergency for that game after being one of the better players in the semi final when he suffered a knee injury and was listed as extremely unlucky not to have played in that Grand Final.

Lionel Ryan moved to Yarrawonga Football Club in 1958 and was a member of Yarrawonga's 1959 Ovens and Murray Football League Premiership team and later moved to Wodonga Football Club as Captain / Coach from 1961 to 1963.

Ryan was the captain of the Ovens & Murray Football League inter league side in 1963, under coach, Bill Stephen.

While playing with Yarrawonga, Lionel was a huge crowd drawer and bringing huge crowds to watch his strong straight through style of play, brushing aside players with ease.

Lionel was a P.M.G. Linesman in those days and was well known around Tungamah and District.

Lionel’s grandson is Ryan O'Keefe former Sydney Swan’s 2005 and 2012 Premiership player and Norm Smith Medal Winner for best on ground performance in the 2012 Swans Premiership win.

Notes

External links 

		

1935 births
2022 deaths
Australian rules footballers from Victoria (Australia)
Western Bulldogs players
Wodonga Football Club coaches